Blind chess may refer to:

Blindfold chess, in which one or both of the players has their vision deliberately impaired
Kriegspiel (chess), in which neither player can see their opponents' pieces
Blind Chess Olympiad, an international competition for blind players